Kevin Koetters (born September 11, 1968, in Quincy, Illinois) is a retired U.S. soccer midfielder who spent most of his career in the U.S. indoor leagues as well as one with the Kansas City Wiz in Major League Soccer, one in the American Professional Soccer League and one in the USISL.

Koetters attended Rockhurst University, where he was a 1989 second-team NAIA All-American. In 1990, he played for the Colorado Foxes in the American Professional Soccer League.  In 1991, he signed with the Kansas City Attack in the National Professional Soccer League.  He remained with the Attack through the 1998–1999 season.  During these years, Koetters would play for the Attack during the winter, then spend time with other teams during the summer season.  In 1993, he played for the San Diego Sockers of the Continental Indoor Soccer League.  In February 1996, the Kansas City Wiz selected Koetters in the 12th round (116th overall) of the 1996 MLS Inaugural Player Draft.  He saw time in 15 games before being released at the end of the season.  In 1997, he played for the Rochester Rhinos in the USISL.  He then played one game for the Detroit Rockers during the 1999-2000 NPSL season. In 2000, he signed with the St. Louis Steamers in the World Indoor Soccer League.  He also played the 2001 season with them.  He played for the Kansas City Comets of the Major Indoor Soccer League from 2001 to 2002.

In 2005, he became the head coach of Gardner Edgerton High School.

References

External links
 St. Louis Steamers player profile

1968 births
Living people
American soccer players
American Professional Soccer League players
American soccer coaches
Colorado Foxes players
Continental Indoor Soccer League players
Detroit Rockers players
Kansas City Attack players
Kansas City Comets (2001–2005 MISL) players
Sporting Kansas City players
National Professional Soccer League (1984–2001) players
Sportspeople from Quincy, Illinois
Soccer players from Illinois
Rochester New York FC players
USISL players
World Indoor Soccer League players
Major League Soccer players
Association football midfielders